The Tilted Cross (1961) is a novel by Australian author Hal Porter.

Plot outline
The novel is set in Hobart, Tasmania, in 1845-46.  It follows the last few months in the life of Judas Griffin Vaneleigh, a transported forger and suspected poisoner.

Critical reception
A reviewer in The Canberra Times was not as enthusiastic as some of his colleagues: "Porter's baroque style gives his wordage full play. He spins his words like a thick spider's web and in the depths of the web he sets an evil collection of characters . . . They move dimly and poisonously in the mess of words like red-back spiders stirring in a thick web in a dark corner."

See also
 1961 in Australian literature

Notes
 Dedication: With loving gratitude to my sister and brother-in-law, Ida and Alan Rendell
 The Oxford Companion to Australian Literature notes that the lead character is based on Thomas Griffiths Wainewright, although the author has changed some of the historical facts to fit his story.

References

1961 Australian novels